Kevin McIntyre may refer to:

Kevin McIntyre (footballer) (born 1977), English footballer
Kevin McIntyre (boxer) (born 1978), Scottish boxer
Kevin J. McIntyre (1960–2019), American lawyer